Belarus competed at the 2006 Winter Olympics in Turin, Italy. The team collected one medal, a silver in Freestyle Skiing.

Medalists

Biathlon 

Men

Women

Cross-country skiing 

Alexander Lasutkin and Sergei Dolidovich were both scheduled to compete in the 
Men’s 30 km pursuit. However, before the Olympics a blood test showed too much hemoglobin in their blood, and they were suspended from competing for five days.  They also did not compete in the Men’s team sprint competition.

Distance

Sprint

Figure skating 

Key: CD = Compulsory Dance, FD = Free Dance, FS = Free Skate, OD = Original Dance, SP = Short Program

Freestyle skiing

Short track speed skating 

Key: 'ADV' indicates a skater was advanced due to being interfered with.

Ski jumping 

Note: PQ indicates a skier was pre-qualified for the final, based on entry rankings.

Speed skating

References
 
 Two American Skiers, Six Others Suspended – Dolidovich and Lazutkin were suspended due to health reasons for the first five days of competition after recording too high values of hemoglobin in their blood.
 Qualification Tournament Results

Nations at the 2006 Winter Olympics
2006
Winter Olympics